The phrase "semiotic anthropology" was first used by Milton Singer (1978). Singer's work brought together the semiotics of Charles Sanders Peirce and Roman Jakobson with theoretical streams that had long been flowing in and around the University of Chicago, where Singer taught. In the late 1970s, Michael Silverstein, a young student of Jakobson's at Harvard University, joined Singer in Chicago's Department of Anthropology. Since that time, anthropological work inspired by Peirce's semiotic have proliferated, in part as students of Singer and Silverstein have spread out across the country, developing semiotic-anthropological agendas of their own.

Overview
Semiotic anthropology has its precursor in Malinowski's contextualism (which may be called anthropological semantics), which was later resumed by John Rupert Firth. Anthropological approaches to semantics are alternative to the three major types of semantics approaches: linguistic semantics, logical semantics, and general semantics. Other independent approaches to semantics are philosophical semantics and psychological semantics.
Elizabeth Mertz has recently reviewed the burgeoning literature in semiotic anthropology (2007). The freshest research in the field refer to the theory of sign setting the aim for the scientific program:

"Semiotic anthropology, as a research program, sets itself several goals. The first
is the establishment of a “cultural theory of signs” as a hypostatic object
functioning in higher-order ontologies. The second is reduction of the paradigms
of the research on culture to one, merging the philosophical-philological and
anthropological-ethnographic perspectives in order to unify methodology and
specialize research techniques. In this sense, semiotic anthropology ought to
perform an auxiliary function; in other words, semiotics is always the semiotics
of something [...]. The third goal is the development of an effective analytical tool for cultural
messages such as architecture, painting, eating habits, or fashion, which constitute
material reflections of the systems of values of a certain community.
Cultural messages have recorded the “world of culture” of people who perceived
reality in a certain way. The interpretation of this closed “world of culture” is a
difficult but also useful task, as it enables one to better understand the people
who created this world." (Boroch 2018: 222).

See also
Contextualism
Susan Gal
Symbolic anthropology

Notes

References
Singer, M. B. (1978). "For a Semiotic Anthropology," in Sight, Sound and Sense. Edited by T. Sebeok, pp. 202–231. Bloomington: Indiana University Press.

Robert Boroch (2018) "Rethinking Milton Singer’s Semiotics Anthropology: A Reconnaissance". Semiotica: Journal of the International Association for Semiotic Studies. Vol. 224, p. 222.

Further reading
Edwin Ardener (editor) (1971) Social anthropology and language, 
Milton B. Singer (1984) Man's glassy essence: explorations in semiotic anthropology
Robert Boroch (2018) "Rethinking Milton Singer’s Semiotics Anthropology: A Reconnaissance". Semiotica: Journal of the International Association for Semiotic Studies. Vol. 224, pp. 211-222.

Anthropology
Semiotics
Symbolic anthropology